An atmospheric radiative transfer model, code, or simulator calculates radiative transfer of electromagnetic radiation through a planetary atmosphere.

Methods 

At the core of a radiative transfer model lies the radiative transfer equation that is numerically solved using a solver such as a discrete ordinate method or a Monte Carlo method. The radiative transfer equation is a monochromatic equation to calculate radiance in a single layer of the Earth's atmosphere. To calculate the radiance for a spectral region with a finite width (e.g., to estimate the Earth's energy budget or simulate an instrument response), one has to integrate this over a band of frequencies (or wavelengths). The most exact way to do this is to loop through the frequencies of interest, and for each frequency, calculate the radiance at this frequency. For this, one needs to calculate the contribution of each spectral line for all molecules in the atmospheric layer; this is called a line-by-line calculation.
For an instrument response, this is then convolved with the spectral response of the instrument. A faster but more approximate method is a band transmission. Here, the transmission in a region in a band is characterised by a set of pre-calculated coefficients (depending on temperature and other parameters). In addition, models may consider scattering from molecules or particles, as well as polarisation; however, not all models do so.

Applications 

Radiative transfer codes are used in broad range of applications. They are commonly used as forward models for the retrieval of geophysical parameters (such as temperature or humidity). Radiative transfer models are also used to optimize solar photovoltaic systems for renewable energy generation. Another common field of application is in a weather or climate model, where the radiative forcing is calculated for greenhouse gases, aerosols, or clouds. In such applications, radiative transfer codes are often called radiation parameterization. In these applications, the radiative transfer codes are used in forward sense, i.e. on the basis of known properties of the atmosphere, one calculates heating rates, radiative fluxes, and radiances.

There are efforts for intercomparison of radiation codes. One such project was ICRCCM (Intercomparison of Radiation Codes in Climate Models) effort that spanned the late 1980s - early 2000s.  The more current (2011) project, Continual Intercomparison of Radiation Codes, emphasises also using observations to define intercomparison cases.

Table of models

Molecular absorption databases 

For a line-by-line calculation, one needs characteristics of the spectral lines, such as the line centre, the intensity, the lower-state energy, the line width and the shape.

See also 
 Discrete dipole approximation codes
 Codes for electromagnetic scattering by cylinders
 Codes for electromagnetic scattering by spheres
 Optical properties of water and ice

References
Footnotes

General
Bohren, Craig F. and Eugene E. Clothiaux, Fundamentals of atmospheric radiation: an introduction with 400 problems,  Weinheim : Wiley-VCH, 2006, 472 p., .
 Goody, R. M. and Y. L. Yung, Atmospheric Radiation: Theoretical Basis. Oxford University Press, 1996 (Second Edition), 534 pages, .
Liou, Kuo-Nan, An introduction to atmospheric radiation, Amsterdam ; Boston : Academic Press, 2002, 583 p., International geophysics series, v.84, .
Mobley, Curtis D., Light and water: radiative transfer in natural waters; based in part on collaborations with Rudolph W. Preisendorfer, San Diego, Academic Press, 1994, 592 p., 
Petty, Grant W, A first course in atmospheric radiation (2nd Ed.), Madison, Wisconsin : Sundog Pub., 2006, 472 p., 
Preisendorfer, Rudolph W., Hydrologic optics, Honolulu, Hawaii : U.S. Dept. of Commerce, National Oceanic & Atmospheric Administration, Environmental Research Laboratories, Pacific Marine Environmental Laboratory, 1976, 6 volumes.
Stephens, Graeme L., Remote sensing of the lower atmosphere : an introduction, New York, Oxford University Press, 1994, 523 p. .
 Thomas, Gary E. and Knut Stamnes, Radiative transfer in the atmosphere and ocean, Cambridge, New York, Cambridge University Press, 1999, 517 p., .
 Zdunkowski, W., T. Trautmann, A. Bott, Radiation in the Atmosphere. Cambridge University Press, 2007, 496 pages,

External links
ITWC for radiative transfer

 
Science-related lists
Satellite meteorology